RTL Zwei (stylised as RTLZWEI), formerly spelled RTL 2 and RTL II, is a German-language television channel that is operated by RTL2 Television GmbH & Co. KG. RTL2 is a private television broadcaster with a full program (Vollprogramm) according to the Interstate Broadcasting Agreement (Rundfunkstaatsvertrag). For Austria and Switzerland, variants of the main programme are produced with nationally inserted advertising islands; these variants can be received via the cable networks in these two countries as well as via digital satellite. RTL Zwei is the second subsidiary of RTL Group in Germany.

History
On 26 September 1992, RTL II was scheduled to begin broadcasting; select programming guides were anticipating the channel's launch during that time. However, the channel's launch was delayed until 1993 because LPR Hessen (known as the Hessische Landesanstalt für privaten Rundfunk) repeatedly raised concerns about the channel's shareholder structure to the German media authorities. The shares of the channel's initial owners (RTL Television, CLT, Bertelsmann, Burda and FAZ) had to be reduced to below 25% before the licence for the channel could be awarded to RTL. The channel eventually started broadcasting on 6 March 1993 at 6:09 a.m., replacing Screensport (which ceased operations five days earlier due to its merger with Eurosport) on the Astra satellite service. The first programme on the channel was the movie Ein reizender Fratz.

In 2000, RTL II began broadcasting the shows Popstars and Big Brother; Popstars ran on the channel for two seasons before it was moved to ProSieben, while Big Brother continued to air until 2011.

The network began offering a video on demand service in February 2012.

As of 7 October 2019, the channel was rebranded as RTLZWEI. The number 2 is written out for the first time in the station's history. The design was developed in cooperation with the agency mehappy GmbH.

Visual identity (logos)

Ownership
The channel is operated by RTL2 TV GmbH & Co. KG, which was founded in 1992 and employs approximately 210 people. Since June 2014 its Managing Director has been Andreas Bartl. The company was originally headquartered in Cologne, but is now run in the municipality of Grünwald, to the south of Munich; only its news department is still based in Cologne, in order to share the production facilities of RTL news. The company is jointly owned by: RTL Group S.A. (35.9%), Bauer Media Group (31.5%), Tele-Munich Television Media Participation LP (31.5%, of which the Leonine Holding and The Walt Disney Company hold 50% each). and Hubert Burda Media (1.1%)

Programming
Programming pillars are daily episodes of the local Big Brother in access prime-time, and a prime-time lineup consisting mostly of "docu-soaps", movies and licensed series such as 24 and Stargate SG-1. Recent efforts to move further towards quality programming with science magazines and documentaries have met with an indifferent audience response.

The channel's prime-time newscast RTL II News is frequently criticized for its selection of news stories, which are seen to cater to a young audience; for example, it has been known to put a CD release or the launch of a new gaming console in the second headline slot directly after the day's top event. This unconventional approach has brought RTL II's broadcasting licence into jeopardy at least once, as a German commercial broadcaster has to feature minimum amounts of serious informational and cultural programming to be allowed a full channel licence. In addition to its own newscast formats (RTL II News, RTL II Spezial. Das Magazin and Das Nachrichtenjournal), the channel commissions independent producers to create its own productions, which it airs in the afternoons.

Afternoon programming 
In the afternoon, the channel now primarily features its own docu soap and reality show productions.

Prime-time 
Among its prime-time line-up the channel's own docu soap productions such as Die Geissens – Eine schrecklich glamouröse Familie and Frauentausch are particularly successful. Various US shows such as Game of Thrones and The Walking Dead have been, and continue to be, the most successful series of RTL II's prime-time slot. Its late-night line-up also features North American series such as Autopsy – Mysteriöse Todesfälle and Flashpoint.

Anime and children's programming 
RTL II has offered the largest anime content of all free-to-air German-language TV channels. It aired about over 80 Anime series since the channel and also broadcast cartoons. On weekdays, RTL II also airs an anime afternoon under their children/youth banner "Pokito". Following tensions with media authorities, RTL II's standards and practices department is believed to be especially sensitive about children's programming. As a consequence, the channel has cut scenes in anime series like Detective Conan, InuYasha, One Piece and Naruto, for which it has received criticism from anime fans. Even some episodes where the original version had previously been given a FSK 6 rating, meaning that it is suitable for children ages 6 up and may legally be aired at all hours of the day, have been edited down. In February 2013, RTL II announced that its Sunday morning children's programme would be discontinued as of 21 April 2013. A separate and short-lived online channel for anime was launched in April.

German premieres 
RTL II was the first channel to introduce various foreign TV formats on German television such as:

The Final Countdown: a show aired at the start of the new millennium lasting 24 hours and showing celebrations in various locations all over the world.
Popstars in 2000 was the first casting show aired on German television.
Jack Point Jack in 2003 was the first interactive movie on German television.
Bollywood movies: On 19 November 2004 RTL II aired Sometimes happiness, sometimes sadness (German: In guten wie in schweren Tagen - original title: Kabhi Khushi Kabhie Gham), the first dubbed Bollywood movie on German television, and achieved an audience share of over 12.3% among the target group of 14- to 49-year-olds. Due to its great success Indian movies have been regularly aired on the channel ever since. Previously, Bollywood movies had been broadcast in Hindi with German subtitles on ARTE and VOX.

Audience share

Germany

The average age of the viewers is 43.5 years (as of 2016).

References

External links
Official website 

Television stations in Germany
Television stations in Austria
Television stations in Switzerland
RTL Group
Television channels and stations established in 1993
Mass media in Munich